Martial Arts Weekend is an album by indie-rock band The Extra Glenns, a band made up John Darnielle and Franklin Bruno. The album was released in 2002.

Critical reception
Pitchfork wrote that "after the initial novelty of hearing more than your average instrumentation beneath Darnielle's literate whine, Martial Arts Weekend comes off as a semi-pleasing but second-tier Mountain Goats effort."

Track listing
 "Baltimore" - 2:45
 "All Rooms Cable A/C Free Coffee" - 1:48
 "Ultra Violet" - 2:47
 "Twelve Hands High" - 2:47
 "The River Song" - 3:25
 "Somebody Else's Parking Lot in Sebastopol" - 2:17
 "Memories" (Leonard Cohen cover) - 4:00
 "Going to Morocco" - 2:10
 "Going to Michigan" - 2:29
 "Terminal Grain" - 1:58
 "Malevolent Seascape Y" - 3:43
 "Going to Marrakesh" - 2:47

References

2002 albums
Absolutely Kosher Records albums